The men's 1000 metres race of the 2015–16 ISU Speed Skating World Cup 3, arranged in Eisstadion Inzell, in Inzell, Germany, was held on 5 December 2015.

Kjeld Nuis of the Netherlands won the race, while Denis Yuskov of Russia came second, and Kai Verbij of the Netherlands came third. Gilmore Junio of Canada won the Division B race.

Results
The race took place on Saturday, 5 December, with Division B scheduled in the morning session, at 09:30, and Division A scheduled in the afternoon session, at 14:00.

Division A

Division B

References

Men 1000
3